Obereggen is a mountain village in South Tyrol, northern Italy. It is situated at the foot of the Latemar and known as a ski resort. Obereggen is part of the frazione St. Nikolaus/Eggen of the comune (municipality) of Deutschnofen.

Geography of South Tyrol
Ski areas and resorts in Italy